The 1966–67 Scottish Cup was the 82nd season of Scotland's most prestigious football knockout competition. The Cup was won by Celtic who defeated Aberdeen in the final.

Preliminary round 1

Preliminary round 2

Replays

First round

Replays

Second round

Replays

Quarter-finals

Replays

Semi-finals

Replay

Final

See also
1966–67 in Scottish football
1966–67 Scottish League Cup

References

 
Scottish Cup seasons
Cup